The Xīnmínbǎo Group is a group of geological formations in north central China. They occur across a large depression between the Altai mountains of Mongolia to the north and the Qilian mountains of the Qinghai Plateau to the south, in the Gōngpóquán (公婆泉) and Suànjǐngzi (算井子) basins, and also in the neighbouring Jiuquan Basin.

Both of these areas are inland basins consisting of fluvial (river), lacustrine (lake), and intermontane (between mountains) alluvial fan (floodplain) sediments that were deposited during the Early Cretaceous, probably during the Aptian or possibly late Barremian stage, when the climate was semi-arid and subtropical.

The group has been visited by many expeditions including the Silk Road dinosaur expedition of 1992 which concentrated on the area around Mazong Shan.

Geology 
The group is made up of three main formations.

Chijinbao Formation 
This consists of a lower red unit of coarse conglomerates grading to fine sandstones representing river channel to alluvial fan deposits, and an upper unit of red clastic sediments from either overbank deposits in a meandering fluvial environment, or accumulation in a shallow lacustrine or paludal (marsh) environment.

Digou Formation 
This consists of grey siltstones and calcareous mudstones comprising two sequences of fluvio-lacustrine sedimentation with some alluvial fan and littoral (lake-shore) deposits.

Zhonggou Formation 
This consists of red siltstones and mudstones in a series of upwardly coarsening cycles of lacustrine sediments.

Vertebrate fauna

Ceratopsians

Crocodilians 
Indeterminate crocodilian remains are known from the group.

Fish

Ornithopods

Pterosaurs

Saurischians

Thyreophorans 
Indeterminate ankylosaur remains are known from the group.

Turtles

See also 

 List of dinosaur-bearing rock formations

References

Further reading 
 A new Psittacosaur (Psittacosaurus mazongshanensis sp. nov.) from Mazongshan area, Ganzu Province. Xu, X. Sino-Japanese Silk Road dinosaur expedition., Dong, Z. (ed). China Ocean press; 48-67 (1997).
 Biostratigraphy and palaeoenvironment of the dinosaur-bearing sediments in Lower Cretaceous of Mazongshan area, Gansu Province, China. Tang, F., Luo, Z., Zhou, Z., You, H., Georgi, J., Tang, Z., and Wang. X. Cretaceous Research 22, 115-129 (2001).

Geologic groups of Asia
Geologic formations of China
Geologic formations of Mongolia
Lower Cretaceous Series of Asia
Barremian Stage
Aptian Stage
Conglomerate formations
Mudstone formations
Sandstone formations
Siltstone formations
Fluvial deposits
Lacustrine deposits
Fossiliferous stratigraphic units of Asia
Paleontology in China
Paleontology in Mongolia